Numerous things are named after the French mathematician Charles Hermite (1822–1901):

Hermite 
 Cubic Hermite spline, a type of third-degree spline
 Gauss–Hermite quadrature, an extension of Gaussian quadrature method 
 Hermite class
 Hermite differential equation
 Hermite distribution, a parametrized family of discrete probability distributions
 Hermite–Lindemann theorem, theorem about transcendental numbers
 Hermite constant, a constant related to the geometry of certain lattices
 Hermite-Gaussian modes
 The Hermite–Hadamard inequality on convex functions and their integrals
 Hermite interpolation, a method of interpolating data points by a polynomial
 Hermite–Kronecker–Brioschi characterization
 The Hermite–Minkowski theorem, stating that only finitely many number fields have small discriminants
 Hermite normal form, a form of row-reduced matrices
 Hermite numbers, integers related to the Hermite polynomials
 Hermite polynomials, a sequence of polynomials orthogonal with respect to the normal distribution
Continuous q-Hermite polynomials
Continuous big q-Hermite polynomials
Discrete q-Hermite polynomials
Wiener–Hermite expansion
 Hermite reciprocity, a reciprocity law concerning covariants of binary forms
 Hermite ring, a ring over which every stably free module is free of unique rank
 Hermite-Sobolev spaces

Hermite's 

 Hermite's cotangent identity, a trigonometric identity
 Hermite's criterion
 Hermite's identity, an identity on fractional parts of integer multiples of real numbers
 Hermite's problem, an unsolved problem on certain ways of expressing real numbers
 Hermite's theorem, that there are only finitely many algebraic number fields of discriminant less than a given magnitude

Hermitian 
Einstein–Hermitian vector bundle
Deformed Hermitian Yang–Mills equation
Hermitian adjoint
Hermitian connection, the unique connection on a Hermitian manifold that satisfies specific conditions
Hermitian form, a specific sesquilinear form
Hermitian function, a complex function whose complex conjugate is equal to the original function with the variable changed in sign

Hermitian manifold/structure
Hermitian metric, is a smoothly varying positive-definite Hermitian form on each fiber of a complex vector bundle
Hermitian matrix, a square matrix with complex entries that is equal to its own conjugate transpose
Skew-Hermitian matrix
Hermitian operator, an operator (sometimes a symmetric operator, sometimes a symmetric densely defined operator, sometimes a self-adjoint operator)
Hermitian polynomials, a classical orthogonal polynomial sequence that arise in probability
Hermitian symmetric space, a Kähler manifold which, as a Riemannian manifold, is a Riemannian symmetric space
Hermitian transpose, the transpose of a matrix and with the complex conjugate of each entry
Hermitian variety, a generalisation of quadrics
Hermitian wavelet, a family of continuous wavelets
Non-Hermitian quantum mechanics

Astronomical objects 

 24998 Hermite, a main-belt asteroid
 Hermite (crater)

Hermite